Mike Bauer and David Rikl were the defending champions, but did not participate this year.

Karel Nováček and Mats Wilander won the title, defeating Tomás Carbonell and Francisco Roig 4–6, 7–6, 7–6 in the final.

Seeds

  Sergio Casal /  Emilio Sánchez (first round)
  Cristian Brandi /  Federico Mordegan (first round)
  Tomás Carbonell /  Francisco Roig (final)
  Donald Johnson /  Greg Van Emburgh (first round)

Draw

Draw

External links
 Draw

1994 Doubles
1994 ATP Tour